Jesse Hernandez is an American cheerleader. He is considered one of the first male National Football League (NFL) cheerleaders, along with Napoleon Jinnies and Quinton Peron.

He graduated from North Vermillion High School in his hometown of Maurice, Louisiana.

See also
List of cheerleaders

References

Living people
Year of birth missing (living people)
National Football League cheerleaders
People from Maurice, Louisiana